Lucie Hloupá is a Czech former football midfielder who played for Slavia Praha in the Czech First Division. She was voted talent of the year at the 2012 Czech Footballer of the Year (women), Hloupá played for the Czech national team in 2014.

International career
She made her debut for the national team on 7 May 2014 in a FIFA World Cup qualification match against Romania.

Career honours

Club
 Czech First Division (3): 2012-13, 2015-16, 2016-17
 Czech Cup (3): 2012-13, 2014–15, 2015–16

Individual
 Talent of the Year: 2012

References

External links 
Official FanClub 

1996 births
Living people
Czech women's footballers
Sportspeople from Jablonec nad Nisou
Czech Republic women's international footballers
Women's association football midfielders
SK Slavia Praha (women) players
AC Sparta Praha (women) players
Czech Women's First League players